Falketind is a mountain in Årdal Municipality in Vestland county, Norway. It is located in the Jotunheimen mountain range inside the Utladalen Landscape Protection Area.

The 1820 ascent was the first known ascent on an alpine mountain in Norway. A climbing party which included Baltazar Mathias Keilhau and Christian Peder Bianco Boeck went via Snøggeken (Falkbreen) and the northern ridge. At that time the mountain was named Koldedalstinden, but Aasmund Olavsson Vinje renamed the mountain Falketind more than fifty years later. In retrospect, the expedition leading to the first ascent became known as the "discovery of Jotunheimen" (Jotunheimens oppdagelse).

Name
The first element is falk which means "falcon" and the last element is tind which means "mountain peak".

References

Related reading

External links
Falketind in Norrona Magazine

Årdal
Mountains of Vestland